The history of chocolate began in Mesoamerica. Fermented beverages made from chocolate date back to at least 1900 BC to 1500 BC. The Mexica believed that cacao seeds were the gift of Quetzalcoatl, the god of wisdom, and the seeds once had so much value that they were used as a form of currency. Originally prepared only as a drink, chocolate was served as a bitter liquid, mixed with spices or corn puree. It was believed to be an aphrodisiac and to give the drinker strength. Today, such drinks are also known as "Chilate" and are made by locals in the south of Mexico and the north triangle of Central America (El Salvador, Guatemala and Honduras). 
After its arrival to Europe in the sixteenth century, sugar was added to it and it became popular throughout society, first among the ruling classes and then among the common people. In the 20th century, chocolate was considered essential in the rations of United States soldiers during war.

The word "chocolate" comes from the Classical Nahuatl word xocolātl, of uncertain etymology, and entered the English language via the Spanish language.

History
Cultivation, consumption, and cultural use of cacao were extensive in Mesoamerica where the cacao tree is native. When pollinated, the seed of the cacao tree eventually forms a kind of sheath, or ear, averaging 20" long, hanging from the tree trunk itself. Within the sheath are 30 to 40 brownish-red almond-shaped beans embedded in a sweet viscous pulp. While the beans themselves are bitter due to the alkaloids within them, the sweet pulp may have been the first element consumed by humans.

Cacao pods grow in a wide range of colors, from pale yellow to bright green, all the way to dark purple or crimson. The skin can also vary greatly - some are sculpted with craters or warts, while others are completely smooth. This wide range in type of pods is unique to cacaos in that their color and texture does not necessarily determine the ripeness or taste of the beans inside.

Evidence suggests that it may have been fermented and served as an alcoholic beverage as early as 1400 BC.

Cultivation of the cacao was not an easy process. Part of this was because cacao trees in their natural environment grow to 60 feet tall or more. When the trees were grown on a plantation, however, they grew to around 20 feet tall.

While researchers do not agree on which Mesoamerican culture first domesticated the cacao tree, the use of the fermented bean in a drink seems to have arisen in North America (Mesoamerica—Central America and Mexico). Scientists have been able to confirm its presence in vessels throughout the region by evaluating the "chemical footprint" detectable in the micro samples of contents that remain. Ceramic vessels with residues from the preparation of chocolate beverages have been found at archaeological sites dating back to the Early Formative (1900–900 BC) period. For example, one such vessel found at an Olmec archaeological site on the Gulf Coast of Veracruz, Mexico dates chocolate's preparation by pre-Olmec peoples as early as 1750 BC.  On the Pacific coast of Chiapas, Mexico, a Mokayanan archaeological site provides evidence of cacao beverages dating even earlier, to 1900 BC.

A study, published online in Nature Ecology and Evolution, suggests that cacao—the plant from which chocolate is made—was domesticated, or grown by people for food, around 1,500 years earlier than previously thought. In addition, the researchers found cacao was originally domesticated in South America, rather than in Central America. “This new study shows us that people in the upper reaches of the Amazon basin, extending up into the foothills of the Andes in southeastern Ecuador, where harvesting and consuming cacao that appears to be a close relative of the type of cacao later used in Mexico—and they were doing this 1,500 years earlier,” said Michael Blake, study co-author and professor in the University of British Columbia department of anthropology. The researchers used three lines of evidence to show that the Mayo-Chinchipe culture used cacao between 5,300 and 2,100 years ago: the presence of starch grains specific to the cacao tree inside ceramic vessels and broken pieces of pottery; residues of theobromine, a bitter alkaloid found in the cacao tree but not its wild relatives; and fragments of ancient DNA with sequences unique to the cacao tree.

Pueblo people, who lived in an area now the U.S. Southwest, imported cacao from Mesoamerican cultures in southern Mexico between 900 and 1400. They used it as a common beverage consumed by many people within their society.

Archaeological evidence of Cacao in Mesoamerica 
Nature Ecology and Evolution reported what is believed to be the earliest cacao use from approximately 5,300 years ago recovered from the Santa Ana (La Florida) site in southeast Ecuador. Another find of chemically traced cacao was in 1984 when a team of archaeologists in Guatemala explored the Mayan site of Río Azul. They discovered fifteen vessels surrounding male skeletons in the royal tomb. One of these vessels was beautifully decorated and covered in various Mayan glyphs. One of these glyphs translated to "kaka", also known as cacao. The inside of the vessel was lined with a dark-colored powder, which was scraped off for further testing. When the archaeologists took this powder to the Hershey Center for Health and Nutrition to be tested, they found trace amounts of theobromine in the powder, a major indicator of cacao. This cacao was dated to sometime between 460 and 480 AD 

Cacao powder was also found in decorated bowls and jars, known as teammates, in the city of Puerto Escondido. Once thought to have been a scarce commodity, cacao was found in many more teammates than once thought. However, since this powder was only found in bowls of higher quality, it led archaeologists to believe that only wealthier people could afford such bowls, and therefore the cacao. The cacao teammates are believed to have been a centerpiece to social gatherings between people of high social status.

Olmec use 
Earliest evidence of domestication of the cacao plant dates to the Olmec culture from the Preclassic period. The Olmecs used it for religious rituals or as a medicinal drink, with no recipes for personal use. Little evidence remains of how the beverage was processed.

Mayan use 
The Mayans (in Guatemala) produced writings about cacao that confirmed the identification of the drink with the gods. The Dresden Codex specifies that it is the food of the rain deity Chaac, and the Madrid Codex says that gods shed their blood on the cacao pods as part of its production. The Maya people gathered once a year to give thanks to the god Ek Chuah who they saw as the Cacao god. The consumption of the chocolate drink is also depicted on pre-Hispanic vases. The Maya seasoned their chocolate by mixing the roasted cacao seed paste into a drink with water, chile peppers, and cornmeal, transferring the mixture repeatedly between pots until the top was covered with a thick foam, or "head", similar to that found on beer.

There were many uses for cacao among the Maya. It was used in official ceremonies and religious rituals, at feasts and festivals, as funerary offerings, as tribute, and for medicinal purposes. Both cacao itself and vessels and instruments used for the preparation and serving of cacao were used for important gifts and tributes. Cacao beans were used as currency, to buy anything from avocados to turkeys to sex. A rabbit, for example, was worth ten cacao beans, (called “almonds” by the early sixteenth-century chronicler Francisco Oviedo y Valdés), a slave about a hundred, and the services of a prostitute, eight to ten “according to how they agree”. The beans were also used in betrothal and marriage ceremonies among the Maya, especially among the upper classes.

“The form of the marriage is: the bride gives the bridegroom a small stool painted in colors, and also gives him five grains of cacao, and says to him “These I give thee as a sign that I accept thee as my husband.” And he also gives her some new skirts and another five grains of cacao, saying the same thing.”

Maya's preparation of cacao started with cutting open cacao pods to expose the beans and the fleshy pulp. The beans were left out to ferment for a few days. In some cases, the beans were also roasted over an open fire to add a smoky flavor. The beans then had their husks removed and ground into a paste. Since sweeteners were rarely used by Maya, the cacao paste was flavored with additives like flowers, vanilla pods, and chilies. The vessel used to serve this chocolate liquid was stubbier by nature to help make the liquid frothier. The vessels also tended to be decorated in intricate designs and patterns, which tended to only be accessible by the rich.

Aztec use 
By 1400, the Aztec Empire took over a sizable part of Mesoamerica. The Aztecs had not cultivated cacao themselves, so were forced to import it. All of the areas that were conquered by the Aztecs that grew cacao balls were ordered to pay them as a tax. The cacao bean became a form of currency. The Spanish conquistadors left records of the value of the cacao bean, noting for instance that 100 beans could purchase a canoe filled with fresh water or a turkey hen. The Aztecs associated cacao with the god Quetzalcoatl, who they believed had been condemned by the other gods for sharing chocolate with humans. Unlike the Maya of Yucatán, the Aztecs drank chocolate cold. It was consumed for a variety of purposes, as an aphrodisiac or as a treat for men after banquets, and it was also included in the rations of Aztec soldiers. Some Aztec sacrifice victims who did not wish to join in ritual dancing before their death were usually given a gourd of chocolate to cheer them up.

History in Europe

Early history
Until the 16th century, the cacao tree was wholly unknown to Europeans.

Christopher Columbus encountered the cacao bean on his fourth mission to the Americas on August 15, 1502, when he and his crew seized a large native canoe that proved to contain among other goods for trade, cacao beans. His son Ferdinand commented that the natives greatly valued the beans, which he termed almonds, "for when they were brought on board ship together with their goods, I observed that when any of these almonds fell, they all stooped to pick it up, as if an eye had fallen." But while Columbus took cacao beans with him back to Spain, it made no impact until Spanish friars introduced chocolate to the Spanish court.

Spanish conquistador Hernán Cortés may have been the first European to encounter chocolate when he observed it in the court of Montezuma in 1519. In 1568, Bernal Díaz, who accompanied Cortés in the conquest of the Aztec Empire, wrote of this encounter which he witnessed:
From time to time, they served him [Montezuma] in cups of pure gold a certain drink made from cacao. It was said that it gave one power over women, but this I never saw. I did see them bring in more than fifty large pitchers of cacao with froth in it, and he drank some of it, the women serving with great reverence.

José de Acosta, a Spanish Jesuit missionary who lived in Peru and then Mexico in the later 16th century, described its use more generally:
Loathsome to such as are not acquainted with it, having a scum or froth that is very unpleasant taste. Yet it is a drink very much esteemed among the Indians, wherewith they feast noble men who pass through their country. The Spaniards, both men and women that are accustomed to the country are very greedy of this chocolate. They say they make diverse sorts of it, some hot, some cold, and some temperate, and put therein much of that "chili"; yea, they make paste thereof, the which they say is good for the stomach and against the catarrh.

After the Spanish conquest of the Aztecs, chocolate was imported to Europe. In the beginning, Spaniards would use it as a medicine to treat illnesses such as abdominal pain because it had a bitterness to it. Once sweetened, it transformed. It quickly became a court favorite. It was still served as a beverage, but the addition of sugar or honey counteracted the natural bitterness. The Spaniards initially intended to recreate the original taste of the Mesoamerican chocolate by adding similar spices, but this habit had faded away by the end of the eighteenth century. At first chocolate was largely a privilege of the rich while the lower class drank coffee, but once the steam engine was invented in the late 1700s, mass production became possible.  Within about a hundred years, chocolate had established a foothold throughout Europe.

Etymology
According to the authority on the Spanish language, the Royal Spanish Academy, the Spanish word "chocolate" is derived from the Nahuatl word "xocolatl" (pronounced ), which is made up from the words "xococ" meaning sour or bitter, and "atl" meaning water or drink.  However, as William Bright noted the word "chocolatl" doesn't occur in early central Mexican colonial sources, making this an unlikely derivation. Early sources have cacaua atl meaning "a drink made from cacao". The word xocolatl is not attested; there is a different word xocoatl referring to a drink made of maize. The proposed development x- to ch- is also unexplained. Santamaria gives a derivation from the Yucatec Maya word chokol meaning hot, and the Nahuatl atl meaning water.  More recently Dakin and Wichman derive it from an original Eastern Nahuatl form chicolatl, which they relate to the term for a beater or frothing stick, chicoli, hence "beaten drink".   Kaufman and Justeson disagree with this etymology (and all other suggestions), considering that the origin of the first element of the name remains unknown, but agree that the original form was likely chicolatl.

Expansion

The desire for chocolate created a thriving slave market, as between the early 17th and late 19th centuries the laborious and slow processing of the cacao bean was manual. Cacao plantations spread, as the English, Dutch, and French colonized and planted. With the depletion of Mesoamerican workers, largely to disease, cocoa beans production was often the work of poor wage laborers and enslaved Africans.

In 1729, the first mechanical cocoa grinder was invented in Bristol, England.  Walter Churchman petitioned the king of England for patent and sole use of an invention for the “expeditious, fine and clean making of chocolate by an engine.” The patent was granted by King George II to Walter Churchman for a water engine used to make chocolate. Churchman probably used water-powered edge runners for preparing cacao beans by crushing on a far larger scale than previously.  The patent for a chocolate refining process was later bought in 1761 by Joseph Fry who started the company that was to become J. S. Fry & Sons.

Wind-powered and horse-drawn mills were used to speed production, augmenting human labor. Heating the working areas of the table-mill, an innovation that emerged in France in 1732, also assisted in extraction.
The Chocolaterie Lombart, created in 1760, claimed to be the first chocolate company in France, ten years before Pelletier et Pelletier.

New processes that improved the production of chocolate emerged early in the Industrial Revolution. In 1815, Dutch chemist Coenraad van Houten introduced alkaline salts to chocolate, which reduced its bitterness. A few years thereafter, in 1828, he created a press to remove about half the natural fat (cacao butter) from chocolate liquor, which made chocolate both cheaper to produce and more consistent in quality. This innovation, known as "Dutch cocoa", introduced the modern era of chocolate and was instrumental in the transformation of chocolate to its solid form. In 1847 J. S. Fry & Sons learned to make chocolate moldable by adding back melted cacao butter. Milk had sometimes been used as an addition to chocolate beverages since the mid-17th century, but in 1875 Daniel Peter invented milk chocolate by mixing a powdered milk developed by Henri Nestlé with the liquor. In 1879, the texture and taste of chocolate was further improved when Rodolphe Lindt invented the conching machine.

Lindt & Sprüngli AG, a Swiss-based concern with global reach, had its start in 1845 as the Sprüngli family confectionery shop in Zurich that added a solid-chocolate factory the same year the process for making solid chocolate was developed and later bought Lindt's factory. Besides Nestlé, several chocolate companies had their start in the late 19th and early 20th centuries.  Cadbury was manufacturing boxed chocolates in England by 1868. In 1893, Milton S. Hershey purchased chocolate processing equipment at the World's Columbian Exposition in Chicago and soon began the career of Hershey's chocolates with chocolate-coated caramels.

Due to improvements in machines, chocolate underwent a transformation from a primarily a drink to food, and different types of chocolate began to emerge. At the same time, the price of chocolate began to drop dramatically in the 1890s and 1900s as the production of chocolate began to shift away from the New World to Asia and Africa. Therefore, chocolate could be purchased by the middle class. In 1900–1907, Cadbury's fell into a scandal due to their reliance on West African slave plantations.

Modern use

Roughly two-thirds of the world's cocoa is produced in Western Africa, with Ivory Coast being the largest source, producing a total crop of 1,448,992 Tonnes. Ghana, Nigeria, and Cameroon are other West African countries among the top 5 cocoa-producing countries in the world. Like many food industry producers, individual cocoa farmers are at the mercy of volatile world markets. The price can vary from between £500 ($945) and £3,000 ($5,672) per ton in the space of just a few years. While investors trading in cocoa can dump shares at will, individual cocoa farmers cannot ramp up production and abandon trees at anywhere near that pace.

Only three to four percent of "cocoa futures" contracts traded in the cocoa markets ever end up in the physical delivery of cocoa. Every year seven to nine times more cocoa is bought and sold on the exchange than exists.

See also

 Alonso de Molina's dictionary of 1571 and of 1555
 Food history
 History of yerba mate

Further reading
 Mara P. Squicciarini and Johan Swinnen. 2016. The Economics of Chocolate. Oxford University Press.
HP Newquist. 2017. The Book of Chocolate: The Amazing Story of the World's Favorite Candy, Viking.

References